David Belford West (May 7, 1896 – September 11, 1973) was an American football player.  He was elected to the College Football Hall of Fame in 1954. He attended Colgate University and was a member of Delta Kappa Epsilon fraternity.

References

External links
NFL.com player page
 COLGATE UNIVERSITY ATHLETICS HALL OF HONOR

Just Sports Stats

1896 births
1973 deaths
American football tackles
Colgate Raiders football players
Canton Bulldogs players
All-American college football players
College Football Hall of Fame inductees
Players of American football from Syracuse, New York